Amaurochrous vanduzeei is a species of turtle bug in the family Pentatomidae. It is found in North America.

References

Podopinae
Articles created by Qbugbot
Insects described in 1953